Meldale is a coastal rural locality in the Moreton Bay Region, Queensland, Australia.

Geography

Meldale is bounded by Bullock Creek to the north, the Pumicestone Channel to the north-east (separating the mainland from Bribie Island), and Elimbah Creek to the south and east.

History
The locality was named on 2 July 1983 and is through to be a combination of the surnames of two local land owners: Mellish and Daly.

The median age of the Meldale population was 45 years, 8 years above the national median of 37.  75.7% of people living in Meldale were born in Australia. The other top responses for country of birth were New Zealand 5.5%, England 4.4%, Germany 1.4%, Canada 1.1%, Fiji 1.1%.  89.6% of people spoke only English at home; the next most common languages were 0.8% French, 0.8% Vietnamese, 0.8% Mandarin.

Education 
There are no schools in Meldale. The nearest government primary school is Pumicestone State School in Caboolture to the south-west. The nearest government secondary school is Caboolture State High School, also in Caboolture.

Amenities 
There is a boat ramp in Way Street giving access to Elimbah Creek. It is managed by the Moreton Bay Regional Council.

References  

Suburbs of Moreton Bay Region
Localities in Queensland